Phenylahistin is a metabolite produced by the fungus Aspergillus ustus that belongs to a class of naturally occurring 2,5-diketopiperazines featuring a dehydrohistidine residue that exhibit important biological activities, such as anti-cancer or neurotoxic effects.

Phenylahistin is a microtubule binding agent that exhibits cytotoxic activities against a wide variety of tumor cell lines. A series of synthetic analogs were prepared to remove the chirality and optimize biological activity. These studies led to the potent anti-tumor agent plinabulin, which is active in multidrug-resistant (MDR) tumor cell lines.

References

Diketopiperazines
Imidazoles